Siilhem Mountains, or Sailughem, is a mountain range in the southeastern part of Altai Mountains. The range stretches 130 km north-east from 49° N and 86° E towards the western extremity of the Sayan Mountains in 51° 60′ N (sic) and 89° E. Their mean elevation is 1,500 to 1,750 metres (5000 to 5500 feet). The snow-line runs at 2,000 m on the northern side and at 2,400 m on the southern, and above it the rugged peaks tower up some 975 metres (3200 feet) more.

References

Altai Mountains
Mountain ranges of Russia
Mountain ranges of Mongolia
Landforms of Buryatia